Carrie Koelker is the Iowa State Senator from the 33rd District. A Republican, she has served in the Iowa Senate since 2019. She currently resides in Dyersville, Iowa.

As of February 2020, Koelker serves on the following committees: Commerce (Vice Chair), Appropriations, Labor and Business Relations, Transportation, and Veterans Affairs. She also serves on the Education Appropriations Subcommittee, as well as the Enhance Iowa Board, the Iowa Finance Authority, and the Midwestern Higher Education Compact.

Electoral history

Notes 

Republican Party Iowa state senators
Living people
21st-century American politicians
Year of birth missing (living people)
Women state legislators in Iowa
21st-century American women politicians